HD 90132 (HR 4086) is a solitary white hued star located in the southern constellation Antlia. It has an apparent magnitude of 5.33, making it one of the brighter members of this generally faint constellation.

HD 90132 has a stellar classification of A8 V, indicating that it is an ordinary A-type main-sequence star. At present it has 1.69 times the mass of the Sun and 1.87 times the radius of the Sun. Despite a young age of 70 million years, the star has a lower surface gravity than expected. HD 90132 is slightly metal deficient with a metallicity 74% that of Sun.

This star was observed for infrared excess suggesting the presence of a circumstellar disk, but as of 2017 no excess have been found.

References

Antlia
A-type main-sequence stars
090132
050888
4086
CD-37 06509
High-proper-motion stars
Antliae, 64